Events in the year 2020 in Vietnam.

Incumbents 
 Party General Secretary & President: Nguyễn Phú Trọng
 Prime Minister: Nguyễn Xuân Phúc
 Assembly Chairperson: Nguyễn Thị Kim Ngân

Events 
 20 Dec: VinFuture Prize

Deaths 
 4 January – , 67, Vietnamese actor (Cards on the Table).
 4 February – Nguyễn Văn Chiếu, 70, Vietnamese martial artist, master of Vovinam.

References 

 
2020s in Vietnam
Years of the 21st century in Vietnam
Vietnam
Vietnam